Howard M. Thompson is an American wargame designer and founder of Metagaming Concepts. His first game was Stellar Conquest, a popular and well-designed simulation of interstellar warfare.

Thompson is most famous for his idea to publish small, low-cost games in what came to be known as the MicroGame format. For a while, Metagaming dominated this niche wargaming market.

Career
Howard Thompson founded Metagaming Concepts in 1975 to publish his game Stellar Conquest when no one was interested in publishing the game. Thompson, as the first editor of The Space Gamer magazine, stated "The magazine had been planned for after our third or fourth game but circumstances demand we do it now." In 1976, Thompson published Godsfire, designed by Lynn Willis and developed by Steve Jackson. In 1977, Thompson came up with the concept of the MicroGame, the first of which was Ogre.

In the early 1980s, some speculate that the company started to run into financial trouble, partially because of the generally poor economic situation at that time, and because of the split with one of his main game designers, Steve Jackson. Thompson was not satisfied with the work done on The Fantasy Trip by Jackson, stating that it was too complex and had taken too long. Thompson decided that packaging the game in a box would be too expensive, so he split the product into four books, publishing them individually in 1980 as Advanced Melee, Advanced Wizard, In the Labyrinth, and Tollenkar's Lair; while the game was being prepared, Thompson also changed his production methods and thus Jackson was no longer able to check the final proofs of the game as he had on earlier releases. As a result of these actions, Jackson left Metagaming and founded Steve Jackson Games later that year. Jackson bought The Space Gamer from Metagaming, and sold the rights to The Fantasy Trip to Metagaming. However, Thompson sought legal action against SJG for the rights to a short wargame called One-Page Bulge, and the lawsuit was settled with an agreement that was reached on November 26, 1981 which gave Jackson full rights to One-Page Bulge, and to Ogre and G.E.V. (whose ownership was questioned during the legal proceedings). In the first SJG issue of The Space Gamer, Thompson wrote a report on Metagaming and stated "Metagaming's staff won't miss the effort. After the change in ownership Metagaming feels comfortable with the decision; it was the right thing to do."

Thompson wrote MicroQuest #3 Treasure of the Silver Dragon (1980) and MicroQuest #6 Treasure of Unicorn Gold (1981) for The Fantasy Trip and marketed each of them linked to a real treasure hunt where readers could find out the clues in the books and receive $10,000 from Metagaming. Looking to produce more group-oriented products for The Fantasy Trip, Thompson signed an agreement in 1982 with RPG publisher Gamelords to create a campaign world for the game, but only two campaign books were published.

On 1 January 1982, Thompson created Games Research Group, Inc., which was initially part of Metagaming. On April 16, 1982, Thompson let his two wargame designers go, allowing them to work as freelancers for Games Research Group instead of working as employees. In April 1983, Metagaming ceased operations and Thompson left the industry; Steve Jackson tried to purchase The Fantasy Trip from Thompson, but Jackson declined the offered price of $250,000. Thompson promised to return to the field to produce computer games, but by 1984 he stopped returning phone calls and has subsequently disappeared entirely from the gaming community.

Games designed
 Stellar Conquest (1974)
 Chitin: I (1977)
 WarpWar (1977)
 Treasure of the Silver Dragon (1980) (module for The Fantasy Trip role-playing game)
 Treasure of the Unicorn Gold (1981) (module for The Fantasy Trip)
 Starleader: Assault! (1982)

Illustrations
Thompson also provided illustrations for two of his company's games, Helltank and Monsters! Monsters!

References

External links

Board game designers
Place of birth missing
Possibly living people
Year of birth missing